Mercury(I) hydride (systematically named mercury hydride) is an inorganic compound with the chemical formula HgH. It has not yet been obtained in bulk, hence its bulk properties remain unknown. However, molecular mercury(I) hydrides with the formulae HgH and  have been isolated in solid gas matrices. The molecular hydrides are very unstable toward thermal decomposition. As such the compound is not well characterised, although many of its properties have been calculated via computational chemistry.

Molecular forms

History 
In 1979 and 1985, Swiss chemical physicists, Egger and Gerber, and Soviet chemical physicists, Kolbycheva and Kolbychev, independently, theoretically determined that it is feasible to develop a mercury(I) hydride molecular laser.

Chemical properties 
Mercury(I) hydride is an unstable gas and is the heaviest group 12 monohydride. n mercury(I) hydride, the formal oxidation states of hydrogen and mercury are −1 and +1, respectively, because of the electronegativity of mercury is lower than that of hydrogen. The stability of the diatomic metal hydrides with the formula MH (M = Zn-Hg) increases as the atomic number of M increases.

The Hg-H bond is very weak and therefore the compound has only been matrix isolated at temperatures up to 6 K. The dihydride, HgH2, has also been detected this way.

A related compound is dimercurane(2), or bis(hydridomercury)(Hg—Hg), with the formula , which can be considered to be dimeric mercury(I) hydride. It spontaneously decomposes into the monomeric form.

Electronic nature 
The mercury centre in mercury complexes such as hydridomercury can accept or donate a single electron by association:
HgH + R → HHgR
Because of this acceptance or donation of the electron, hydridomercury has radical character. It is a moderately reactive monoradical.

References 

Mercury(I) compounds
Metal hydrides